Executive Tower (Washington, D.C.) is a high-rise office building located in the United States capital of Washington, D.C. Its construction was completed in 2001. The architect of the building was Hellmuth, Obata & Kassabaum.

The building's tenants include Bloomberg News and the Hoover Institution.

See also
List of tallest buildings in Washington, D.C.

References

Skyscraper office buildings in Washington, D.C.

HOK (firm) buildings
Office buildings completed in 2001
2001 establishments in Washington, D.C.